Hileithia edaphodrepta is a moth in the family Crambidae. It was described by Harrison Gray Dyar Jr. in 1914. It is found in Panama.

The wingspan is about 11.5 mm. The base of the forewings is dotted with black with slender dark lines. The hindwings have a solid discal dot and with a black shade to the inner margin.

References

Moths described in 1914
Spilomelinae